Thomas Wegner Larsen Haaland (25 June 1862 – 12 July 1935) was a Norwegian politician for the Liberal Party.

Born in Torvestad, he worked as a banker and farmer for the most of his career. He was a mayor of Torvestad from 1907. He was elected to the Norwegian Parliament in 1913, representing the constituency of Karmsund. He served only one term.

References

1862 births
1935 deaths
Members of the Storting
Mayors of places in Rogaland
Liberal Party (Norway) politicians
Norwegian bankers